This list of botanical gardens and arboretums in Iowa is intended to include all significant botanical gardens and arboretums in the U.S. state of Iowa

See also
List of botanical gardens and arboretums in the United States

References 

 
Arboreta in Iowa
botanical gardens and arboretums in Iowa